The International Society for Comparative Psychology was founded in 1980 and held its first meeting in 1983.

Purpose
The society:
 Promotes the comparative study of behavior in human and nonhuman animals
 Sponsors a biannual meeting
 Publishes the scientific journal, the International Journal of Comparative Psychology (IJCP).

References

External links
International Society for Comparative Psychology Website
Psychologists for Adults, Children, Adolescents & Couples

Psychology organizations